The Sentencing (Pre-consolidation Amendments) Act 2020 (c. 9) is an act of the Parliament of the United Kingdom to make amendments to existing legislation in order to facilitate the future enactment of the Law Commission's Sentencing Code (to be enacted as the Sentencing Act 2020).

The intention of the act was to correct minor errors and to streamline the law in respect of areas which are to be consolidated under the Sentencing Act 2020. The overall purpose of the law (together with the Sentencing Act 2020) is to remove historic and redundant layers of sentencing procedural legislation without introducing new sentencing law.

Provisions

Main Provisions

Clause 1 provides for a "clean sweep" to remove the need to identify and apply historic versions of the law, minimising the use of complex transitional provisions. The clean sweep is subject to exceptions to ensure that no offender is subject to a greater penalty than that available at the time of the offence, or subject to a minimum or mandatory sentence that did not apply at the time of the offence.

Clause 2 provides for amendments and modifications of existing sentencing legislation to allow for a consistent consolidation and gives powers to the Secretary of State to make further amendments by way of statutory instrument.

The remaining clauses deal with interpretation, how regulations may be laid, the commencement, extent and short title of the act.

Schedules

Schedule 1 provides for a list of exemptions to the "clean sweep" which are required in order to comply with Article 7 of the European Convention on Human Rights and so as not to breach common law standards of fairness.

Schedule 2 provides for pre-consolidation amendments to existing legislation to enable the enactment of consolidation. Such amendment include amendments to the Powers of Criminal Courts (Sentencing) Act 2000, Criminal Justice Act 2003, Criminal Justice and Immigration Act 2008, Armed Forces Act 2006 and other primary and secondary legislation relating to sentencing.

References

2020 in British law
United Kingdom Acts of Parliament 2020